Neuropharmacology is a peer-reviewed scientific journal in the field of neuroscience. It was established in 1962 as the International Journal of Neuropharmacology and obtained its current name in 1970.

External links 
 

Publications established in 1962
Neuroscience journals
Elsevier academic journals
Pharmacology journals
Neuropharmacology